Jayakumar Parameshwaran Pillai is an Indian actor who appears in Malayalam films and television shows. He is best known for portraying comedic roles, but has also played character roles.

Acting career
He started his career as a theatre artist with professional Nataka Samithi and later associated with Athulya Nataka Samithi. Later started his acting career through jayaram movie Njangal Santhushtaranu and gain popularity through Thatteem Mutteem started in 2011.

Television

Other Shows
Sell me the answer (Asianet)
Onnum Onnum Moonu (Mazhavil Manorama)
Take it easy (Mazhavil Manorama)
Minute to win it (Mazhavil Manorama)

Filmography

Films

All films are in Malayalam language unless otherwise noted.

Awards
Asianet Television awards
 2016: Best actor in a humorous role - Karuthamuthu
Asianet Comedy Awards
 2016: Best actor in a humorous role - Karuthamuthu

References

External links

Indian male comedians
Living people
Male actors in Malayalam cinema
Indian male film actors
20th-century Indian male actors
21st-century Indian male actors
Male actors in Malayalam television
Year of birth missing (living people)